is a junction railway station located in the city of Takasaki, Gunma, Japan, operated by the East Japan Railway Company (JR East) and the private railway operator Jōshin Dentetsu. It is also a freight depot for the Japan Freight Railway Company (JR Freight).

Lines
It is also served by the Hachikō Line and the Takasaki Line with through services to and from the Agatsuma Line and Ryōmō Lines. The Jōetsu Line and Shin'etsu Main Line both terminate at Takasaki Station.

Station layout
The Shinkansen portion of the station has two elevated island platforms, with the station building underneath. The JR East local portion of the station has three ground-level island platforms, with one platform forming a half-bay platform, so that a total of seven tracks can be served, and the Jōshin Dentetsu portion of the station has a single bay platform.

JR East

Jōshin Dentetsu

History
The JR East station opened on May 1, 1884, as the then-terminus of the Nippon Railway. The Jōshin Line opened on May 10, 1897. Upon the privatization of the Japanese National Railways (JNR) on 1 April 1987, it came under the control of JR East.
The Jōetsu Shinkansen was extended to Takasaki Station on November 15, 1982.

Bus terminals
Buses serving the station are operated by the following operators. 
 Gunma Bus
 Gunma Chuo Bus
 Kan-etsu Kotsu
 Joshin Railway
 Nippon Chuo Bus

Highway buses
 Sendai Liner; For Sendai Station (Nippon Chuo Bus)
 Azalea; For Narita International Airport (Kan-etsu kotsu, Chiba Kotsu)
 Airport Limousine; For Haneda Airport (Nippon Chuo Bus, Airport Transport Service)
 For Nerima Station, Ikebukuro Station, Shinjuku, and Akihabara Station (Nippon Chuo Bus)
 For Niigata Station, Bandai City Bus Center (Nippon Chuo Bus)
 For Fuji-Q Highland, Kawaguchiko Station (Kan-etsu Kotsu, Fujikyu Yamanashi Bus)
 For Toyama Station, Kanazawa Station and Kenroku-en (Nippon Chuo Bus)
 Silk Liner; For Kanayama Station, Nagoya Station, Nara, Kyōto Station, and Osaka City Air Terminal(Namba Station) (Nippon Chuo Bus)

Passenger statistics
In fiscal 2019, the JR portion of the station was used by an average of 32,160 passengers daily (boarding passengers only). The Jōshin Dentetsu portion of the station was used by 2280 passengers daily in fiscal 2018.

See also
 List of railway stations in Japan

Notes

References

External links

 Takasaki Station information (JR East)

Railway stations in Gunma Prefecture
Stations of East Japan Railway Company
Stations of Japan Freight Railway Company
Railway stations in Japan opened in 1884
Takasaki, Gunma
Takasaki Line
Ryōmō Line
Agatsuma Line
Jōetsu Line
 Hachikō Line
Shōnan-Shinjuku Line
Shin'etsu Main Line
 Hokuriku Shinkansen
Jōetsu Shinkansen